The Sovereign is a large sea-going tugboat owned and operated by Royal Boskalis Westminster N.V.

The vessel is powered by conventional propulsion and was built as a multi-purpose anchor handling tug supply vessel. It was christened on 27 August 2003. Union Sovereign was owned by JP Knight which purchased the initial owner, Klyne Tugs of Lowestoft, in 2007. The vessel was part of the remainder of the fleet of Emergency Towing Vessels that operated on behalf of the UK's Maritime and Coastguard Agency.

On 3 September 2005, Union Sovereign ran aground off Oxna island in the Scalloway Islands while conducting hydrographic surveys. No injuries occurred but the vessel lost approximately 84 tonnes of gas oil and was severely damaged. A 2006 official report found that the shipmaster's consumption of alcohol and several other negligences on board had been the cause of the incident.

Notable operations 
 Towing MSC Flaminia in July 2012

References

Tugboats of the United Kingdom
2003 ships